The following lists events that happened during 1972 in Iran.

Incumbents
 Shah: Mohammad Reza Pahlavi
 Prime Minister: Amir-Abbas Hoveida

Events

February
 9 February – The 1972 Iran blizzard ended after seven days, during which as much as 26 feet of snow buried villages in northwestern, central and southern Iran. An estimated 4,000 people were killed, particularly in the area around Ardakan.

April
 10 April – The 6.7  Qir earthquake shook southern Iran with a maximum Mercalli intensity of IX (Violent), killing 5,374 and injuring 1,710.

Births
 7 May – Asghar Farhadi.
 31 July – Tami Stronach, Iranian-born dancer and former actress

References

 
Iran
Years of the 20th century in Iran
1970s in Iran
Iran